Gëzim Boçari (born 25 March 1949) is an Albanian professor of pharmacology and a politician.

Gëzim Boçari is head of the pharmacology sector of the medicine faculty of the University of Tirana. He is one of the writers of medicine and pharmacology textbooks of Albanian universities. In the 2009 parliamentary elections of Albania he was head candidate of the coalition of Pole of Freedom in the district of Vlorë.

External links 
 Interview of Gëzim Boçari

Sources 

20th-century Albanian politicians
21st-century Albanian politicians
20th-century Albanian writers
21st-century Albanian writers
Albanian people in health professions
Albanian scientists
Pharmacologists
Living people
Academic staff of the University of Tirana
People from Vlorë
1949 births